Mary Poppins, Goodbye (translit. Meri Poppins, do svidaniya) is a Soviet two-part musical miniseries directed by Leonid Kvinikhidze. The movie's runtime is 141 minutes spread across two episodes/parts, "Lady Perfection" and "Week Ends on Wednesday". It is based on the Mary Poppins stories by P. L. Travers. The TV series was produced by Mosfilm for Gosteleradio. The official television premiere was on January 8, 1984.

Cast
 Natalya Andreychenko as Mary Poppins, (vocals by Tatyana Voronina)
 Albert Filozov as Mr. George Banks
 Lembit Ulfsak as Mr. Hey (Robert Robertson), (voice and vocals by Pavel Smeyan)
 Oleg Tabakov as Miss Euphemia Andrew
 Larisa Udovichenko as Mrs. Banks
 Filipp Rukavishnikov as Michael Banks
 Anna Plisetskaya as Jane Banks
 Irina Skobtseva as Mrs. Katie Lark
 Zinovy Gerdt as Admiral Henry Boom
 Marina Nudga as Madame Corry the Ballet Studio Manager 
 Qali Abaydulov as Sire Louis the Dancing Cat
 Semyon Sokolovsky as Sir Wilkins the Elderly Gentleman 
 Igor Yasulovich as Smith the Park Keeper
 Pavel Babakov as Butcher
 Leonid Kanevsky as Bob Goodetty the Excavator Operator
 Yuri Moroz as Postman
 Ilya Rutberg as Official
 Emmanuil Levin as Policeman, (voiced by Artyom Karapetyan)
 Viktor Kārkliņš as Neleus the Marble Boy
 Anatoli Gorokhov (backing vocal)

Plot

Episode 1. Lady Perfection
The film in set in 1980s London, at Number 17, Cherry Tree Lane, where the Banks family lives, they are Mr and Mrs Banks and their children Jane and Michael, also hosting Mrs Banks' brother Robert Robertson living in a tent in their yard, who is a singer and a poet, quickly improvising songs in difficult situations. Mr Banks keeps making unfortunate investments putting a strain on their budget. The family is trying to find a new nanny “for the smallest income possible“ and soon after an advertisement is posted in a newspaper, a mysterious lady called Mary Poppins arrives at their door.

Mary Poppins is shown to have magical powers and leads the children, Jane and Michael, on many magical adventures. She can understand animal language and translates their neighbor’s Kathy Lark dialogue with her dog Andrew, when it poses an ultimatum for her master.

Mary brings the children to a butcher’s to buy sausages and having a cold reception, she makes the butcher sing with an opera voice.

The next morning Banks arrives with a boring machine intending to look for oil reserves but this fails due to a protest by Robert, blocking the way and singing.

Mary and the children take a walk in the park, where they see a statue turn alive asking old Mr Wilkins to let finish reading the magazine story over the shoulder of the old man. The statue of Neleus dances and talks with Jane telling her about his distant parents and his story also confessing in love. Mary is entertained by a conversation with an old crow promising her the change of wind. The park keeper is praised by a policeman observing the statue back on its place.

Mary leaves the family as the wind is changing and instructs Robert to act up. Indeed, he mounts on the bulldozer and starts drilling the surface starting a fountain of fire which the children are happy to see as an adventure.

Episode 2. The Week Ends on Wednesday

Mr Banks is blamed by the local authorities for the breach in the gas pipe and fined £13,500 to be paid by the end of the week, “ending on Wednesday”.

An unexpected arrival of Bank's childhood nanny Miss Euphemia Andrew (portrayed by a male actor Tabakov, out of the ordinary for Soviet cinema) turns the house into a discipline camp and Mr Banks flees.

He hides in Admiral Boom’s bunker and resorts to drinking with him. From the TV report they learn of a fund Ms Andrew established to reward her best ward with £15,000. He returns and the whole family tries to win the prize with exemplary behavior, even going as far as locking protesting Robert in the basement.

Mary returns when the sad children take a walk in the park and she quickly restores peace at home removing Ms Andrew who retreats on a cab. The same night the whole family is invited to a dancing ball where they see their neighbors all participating.

Mary is celebrating her birthday at the ball. Returning home they see a fantastic merry-go-round with their neighbors talking to their childhood selves, while Robert receives a guitar as a goodbye gift from Mary Poppins.

Production
Leonid Kvinikhidze reported in an interview later that his intention was not a film for kids, but for adults. The fact that it was very well received by children was unexpected for him.

The musical material was recorded by three former members of the band Voskreseniye, Vadim Golutvin (guitar), Petr Podgorodetskiy (keyboard), and Vladimir Voronin (drums).

References

External links
 

1983 television films
1983 films
Soviet television films
Mosfilm films
1980s musical films
1980s Russian-language films
Mary Poppins
Films scored by Maksim Dunayevsky
Nannies in fiction